J. C. Hendrix (September 11, 1926April 13, 1963) was an American stock car racing driver. He competed in six NASCAR Grand National Series races from 1959 to 1961, recording two top-ten finishes.

Racing career 
Hendrix made his NASCAR debut at Lakewood Speedway, near his hometown of Griffin, Georgia. Driving the No. 68 Plymouth, he finished 15th after crashing. He broke into the top ten during his next race, at Columbia Speedway, where he finished ninth. Hendrix returned to Lakewood later that year, where he sat on the pole but finished thirteenth, sixteen laps down to winner Richard Petty.  In 1960, W. J. Ridgeway signed Hendrix to run at the newly built Atlanta Motor Speedway. Hendrix fell out of the race with a connecting rod problem and finished 27th. Driving for Fred Clark in car number 30 for the 1961 National 400, Hendrix started 30th but worked his way up to tenth by the end of the race. Running his final race in 1961 at North Wilkesboro Speedway, Hendrix started 19th and finished 13th.

He died on April 13, 1963, in a crash at Cleveland Speedway in Tennessee.

Motorsports career results

NASCAR
(key) (Bold – Pole position awarded by qualifying time. Italics – Pole position earned by points standings or practice time. * – Most laps led.)

Grand National Series

References

External links
 

NASCAR drivers
1926 births
1963 deaths
Racing drivers from Atlanta
Racing drivers from Georgia (U.S. state)
People from Griffin, Georgia
Racing drivers who died while racing
Sports deaths in Tennessee